Keith Walters was the Dean of Science and Mathematics at Valdosta State University. until his arrest for possessing child pornography . He is no longer employed at Valdosta State University. Prior to this, Walters was the Chair of the Department of Chemistry & Biochemistry at Northern Kentucky University.

References

Living people
Year of birth missing (living people)